"Day of Light" is a song by industrial rock band KMFDM that was first released on February 1, 2010, on 7" vinyl, and was limited to 250 copies that sold out in less than 36 hours. The title track on side A features vocals by William Wilson of Legion Within, a band with whom KMFDM frontman Sascha Konietzko worked on two albums. The B-side is an instrumental track. Both tracks were made available for download as mp3s from the KMFDM online store on March 13, 2010, and "Day of Light" was included, along with a remix, on the "Krank" single.

Track listing

Personnel
Sascha Konietzko - vocals, synthesizers, programming, drums, percussion
Lucia Cifarelli - vocals, programming
Jules Hodgson - guitar, bass, programming
William Wilson - vocals

References

KMFDM songs
2010 songs
2010 singles
Songs written by Sascha Konietzko